The Hazleton Redskins were a professional American football team that played in the Eastern Pennsylvania Football League in 1938. They were named league champions after going 5–1. They Redskins were a farm team of the Washington Redskins. They wore colors very similar to that of Washington. Their team president was Dr. Frank Veneroso and their manager was Lou Reynolds.

1938
Their first game was against the Brooklyn Bay Parkways of the American Association. They won the game 19 to 12. Even though it was a close score the Redskins dominated, as they had 223 yards opposed to 33 by Brooklyn. They were led by coach Ed Kahn and quarterback LeRoy "Sunshine" Campbell. The next week they won 14 to 0 against the Wilkes-Barre Panthers. In their third game of the season, the Redskins had their only loss, which was 7 to 0 against the Scranton Miners. They had more first downs, passes, rushing yards and passing yards than Scranton but could not score any points. On the final play of the game, Hazleton threw a pass which was caught at the one yard line of Scranton, but the team could not get there quick enough as the game ended. Shortly afterwards, they scheduled a rematch against Scranton, and won 20 to 0. Shortly before the rematch, they had scheduled a game with the Wilmington Clippers, but canceled. Their next game after Scranton was a matchup with the Reading Rams. They won 19 to 7. On October 30, they won 32 to 2 against the Wilkes-Barre Panthers. In the final game of the EPFL season (and the last of the league before folding) the Redskins  won 13 to 0 over the Shenandoah Rams (they were previously the Reading Rams, but moved before the last game of the season). On December 11, they scheduled a game against the Dixie League Champion Norfolk Shamrocks to be named "Minor-League champions" and won 16 to 14. On December 18, they scheduled a game against the Paterson Panthers, which was canceled. On September 18, 1939, they folded because of other Hazleton sports getting more fan support and because of the folding of the EPFL.

References

American football teams established in 1938
American football teams disestablished in 1939
Sports teams in Pennsylvania